Patricia L. Turner, MD, MBA, FACS is an American general surgeon. She is the first African American, and first woman to serve as executive director and Chief Executive Officer of the American College of Surgeons. Turner formally assumed the role of executive director and CEO on January 1, 2022.

Education 
Turner earned a Bachelor of Arts degree in biology from the University of Pennsylvania and a Doctor of Medicine from the Wake Forest School of Medicine. During medical school, her research in neurobiology and anatomy focused on neuron apoptosis.

She continued her training as an intern and resident in surgery at the Howard University Hospital. During residency, Turner spent two years as a senior staff fellow in the National Heart, Lung, and Blood Institute of the National Institutes of Health. Her work there focused on dysregulation of sodium transport in the kidney and nitric oxide's role in the changing abundance of nephron transporter proteins.

Turner's fellowship training in minimally invasive and laparoscopic surgery was completed at the Icahn School of Medicine at Mount Sinai, Weill Cornell Medicine, and Columbia University Irving Medical Center.

Turner earned a Master of Business Administration from the Robert H. Smith School of Business in 2020.

Career 
Turner spent eight years in academic practice on the faculty of the University of Maryland School of Medicine where she was the surgery residency program director and medical director of the surgical acute care unit. A former adjunct professor in surgery at the Feinberg School of Medicine, Turner is currently a clinical associate professor of surgery in the department of surgery at the Pritzker School of Medicine.

In October 2011, Turner was named director of the American College of Surgeons' Division of Member Services. She left this role at the beginning of 2022, after assuming the position of executive director of the organization.

Turner was elected as president of the Society of Black Academic Surgeons (2016 to 2017) and was the first woman to serve in that role.

Turner has served in other leadership positions, including the following: board member of the Council on Medical Specialty Societies; chair, American College of Surgeons' Delegation to the American Medical Association's House of Delegates; past-chair, American Medical Association's Council on Medical Education; past-chair, Surgical Section of the National Medical Association; and past-president of the surgical section of the National Medical Association. She also serves on the Board of Directors of OceanFirst Bank (OCFC).

Research 
Throughout her career, Turner has been involved in both basic science and clinical research. Her work has focused on dysregulation of sodium transport in the kidney and nitric oxide's role in the changing abundance of nephron transporter proteins. Turner's recent research interests are associated with her clinical expertise in laparoscopic surgery, including developing new training paradigms for residents and more senior surgeons.

Turner served on the editorial board of Surgery News, the official newspaper of the American College of Surgeons, from 2005 to 2009, and has been published in several peer-reviewed journals, including The American Surgeon, The American Journal of Surgery, the Journal of the American College of Surgeons, the Journal of Critical Care Medicine, the Journal of Surgical Research, Obesity Surgery, Surgery, and others.

Awards 
Turner is the recipient of the National Institutes of Health Fellows Award for Research Excellence; the Association of Women Surgeons Outstanding Woman Resident Award; the Claude H. Organ, MD, FACS, Traveling Fellowship; the State of Maryland's Henry Welcome Award, and the National Medical Association Council on Concerns of Women Physicians Service Award.

References 

University of Pennsylvania alumni
Wake Forest University alumni
University System of Maryland alumni
Year of birth missing (living people)
Living people
Wake Forest School of Medicine alumni
American surgeons
Women surgeons
African-American women physicians
University of Maryland, College Park alumni